Philip Benjamin "Phil" Urich is a fictional character appearing in American comic books published by Marvel Comics. He first appeared in Web of Spider-Man #125 (June 1995). He was a superhero as the Green Goblin, and a supervillain as the Hobgoblin. He was later crowned the Goblin Knight before dubbing himself the Goblin King.

Publication history

The character first appeared in Web of Spider-Man #125 (June 1995) as the Green Goblin. Phil Urich's identity and origin was revealed in Green Goblin #1 (October 1995). The character later first appeared in The Amazing Spider-Man #649 (January 2011) as the Hobgoblin.

Fictional character biography

Heroic Green Goblin

The nephew of Ben Urich of the Daily Bugle, Phil stumbles upon one of Harry Osborn's old Goblin hideouts. Using a mask that delivers a "zap" gives him Goblin-level strength seemingly without the psychotic side-effects of the original Goblin formula, he gains enhanced strength and endurance. Following Harry's death, he tries to gain a reputation as a superhero version of Green Goblin. However, he is sometimes seen as being as maniacal as his villainous predecessors. His equipment is damaged during a battle against a Sentinel in the "Onslaught" crossover; Urich sacrifices his glider to destroy a Sentinel by ramming the robot in the head, but a fragment of metal ricochets off the explosion and damages his mask's circuitry. Urich is unable to repair or replace the technology and retires from being the Goblin.

Phil later forms a superhero self-help group with Mickey Musashi in order to prevent teenagers from becoming superheroes, and to help young former superheroes get over their pasts, attempting to convince them and others that their powers had damaged their lives. His intentions are pure, but he accepts funds from a secret benefactor to rescue the Runaways during the "True Believers" story arc. The groups vows to only don their uniform one last time and help the Runaways defeat Ultron's clone. The team vows not to use their powers again, but Mattie Franklin secretly uncovers a MGH drug ring. This leads to Nekra attacking the group during one of their counseling sessions. Urich suffers a mental breakdown after watching Chris Powell and Mickey share a celebratory kiss, having apparently convinced himself that he and Mickey had feelings for each other though she only saw him as a friend. He attacks Mickey and Chris and steals the Darkhawk amulet from Chris. The Loners join together to fight Urich, but he is able to escape with Hollow.

Villainous Hobgoblin

Urich is next seen in the Big Time storyline in New York helping out his uncle at the new Front Line offices. He develops a crush on co-worker Norah Winters who is looking into Goblin Gangs for a story. Urich goes to one of the old Goblin hideouts, hoping to find something there to impress Norah. He encounters Daniel Kingsley (posing as the original Hobgoblin) who is also looking for some new Goblin technology. Kingsley is about to kill him when Urich snaps and uses his Lunatic Laugh to incapacitate Kingsley. Using the fire sword that Kingsley had just found, Urich decapitates Kingsley and steals the new Goblin equipment from Norman Osborn's secret lair. Urich then assumes the Hobgoblin identity for himself now operating as a supervillain. He attacks a local think tank, and is confronted by Spider-Man who save Max Modell from being attacked by the Hobgoblin. Catching Spider-Man off-guard with his Lunatic laugh, Urich tries to decapitate the hero. Bella Fishback, one of the workers at the think tank, is able to disrupt the sonic waves to save Spider-Man, but Urich escapes with the Reverbium he had come to steal. He delivers the metal to the Kingpin and becomes one of his operatives. Spider-Man and the Black Cat fight Urich and the Kingpin to retrieve the experimental metal. During the fight, Urich's Lunatic Laugh causes the building to collapse, but he saves the Kingpin from falling to death.

Urich gives Norah tips about possible Hobgoblin sightings so they can spy together in an attempt to woo Norah away from Randy Robertson. Urich's jealousy of Randy also causes him to break a support beam when Alistair Smythe's Spider-Slayers attack the Front Line offices. This, along with the damage caused by the attack, causes the ceiling to collapse on Randy. Randy survives the collapse, but is seriously injured. Urich (as the Hobgoblin) fights Hercules after a gang that works for the Kingpin is defeated. His pumpkin bombs cause debris to fall on Hercules who escapes from the rubble. He then resumes the fight as the Hobgoblin films the fight with hidden cameras while airing the footage live. Hercules wins the fight, boosting the latter's own popularity instead of Urich's, which was Urich's original intent. The Kingpin convinces Hercules not to hand him over to the authorities. Urich attacks Spider-Girl after Norah talks about how impressive Spider-Girl is; he wants to show Norah that he (as Hobgoblin) is more impressive. He lures Spider-Girl to him by leaving a destructive path to follow. Spider-Girl almost defeats him, but Spider-Man intervenes after seeing what Spider-Girl is doing, believing Spider-Girl is still too inexperienced to fight such a powerful opponent. By doing this, Spider-Man causes the Hobgoblin's escape. Urich finally breaks up Randy and Norah after he stalks and confronts the two in his Hobgoblin persona. Urich then seduces Norah—who does not know the role he played in the breakup—and kisses Norah. Under the Kingpin's orders, Urich teams up with Spider-Girl to fight the Sisterhood of the Wasp in Spider-Island. Urich infiltrates a prisoner transport headed to The Raft to kill the Human Fly for stealing money from the Kingpin. On the transport, he encounters Agent Venom and the two fight. The fight results in a stalemate and the Human Fly escapes.

During a confrontation with Spider-Man, Hobgoblin uses a weapon designed to disrupt Spider-Man's spider-sense. Although it initially appears to have failed, Peter Parker later realizes that it has intensified the spider-sense, causing it to react to the most minor of threats. Peter's mental state, along with a wrongly delivered message from Madame Web, allows Urich to capture Peter while still dazed.

Peter later finds out that Urich and the Kingpin have not discovered Parker's secret identity when Urich refers to Peter as "Spider-Man's best friend". Urich and the Kingpin try to get Peter to tell the two who Spider-Man is but fail. Meanwhile, Roderick Kingsley gets dressed in the original Hobgoblin costume to go searching for him. While Kingsley engages Urich, Modell helps Peter escape. Peter (using webshooters) breaks the disruptor weapon and escapes. The Kingpin then orders the two Hobgoblins after Peter. Both Hobgoblins end up fighting Spider-Man but ultimately give up as Kingsley decides to just kill Urich instead. Kingsley however ends up stopping at the last moment, letting Urich retain the Hobgoblin identity, on the condition that he gives Kingsley a cut of the profits he makes. Urich reluctantly agrees to the arrangement but quickly begins to conspire to kill Kingsley. When Mayor J. Jonah Jameson announces an effort to crack down on supervillains, Urich debates whether it is worthwhile to remain Hobgoblin while paying a lot of money to the Tinkerer for his Hobgoblin gear and to Kingsley for being allowed to be Hobgoblin.

Goblin Knight
When The Superior Spider-Man (Otto Octavius' mind in Spider-Man's body) raids Shadowland, Urich is left to fend for himself while the Kingpin escapes. Urich escapes, encountering Spider-Bots which do not detect him. Following the assault on Shadowland, the Hobgoblin goes to Tinkerer and requests upgrades to his gear in order to survive Superior Spider-Man's aggressive campaign. Tiberius Stone (hiding under Tinkerer) does the upgrades, planning revenge for his ruining Stone while working for the Kingpin. When Superior Spider-Man finally confronts him, his tech fails as a result of Stone's revenge. He escapes, but not before Superior Spider-Man manages to put tracers deep enough into Urich's skin to hear his name over the transmitters. Superior Spider-Man then publicly reveals Urich as Hobgoblin at the Daily Bugle. Seeing the feeds, Urich realizes that he has nowhere left to run. With his Hobgoblin identity revealed to the public, Urich desperately makes excuses as his Daily Bugle co-workers turn against him. Superior Spider-Man, learning Urich's location, arrives at the Daily Bugle and fights with the unstable Urich and disarms him. He seems to consider giving Urich a public execution, but Urich is freed from a prison transport by Menace and brought to get upgrades to his armor and weapons. The Goblin King asks only for full dedication to his only identity from then on as the Goblin Knight. Goblin King trains Goblin Knight who is anxious to jump into action against Superior Spider-Man. The Goblin King reprimands Goblin Knight for causing to shut down his Goblin protocols to avoid detection by Superior Spider-Man. When Monster and Menace attack Kingsley's henchmen (Ringer, Steeplejack, and Tumbler), Goblin Knight kills Steeplejack. Goblin Knight (alongside other Goblin Knights) watched as the Goblin King fought (and killed) the Hobgoblin. Later on, Goblin Knight checks the body to see if it was Kingsley underneath the Hobgoblin mask, and discovers that it is actually Claude (Kingsley's butler) who died. Goblin Knight then destroys Claude's body to ensure that the Goblin King never suspects that Kingsley is still alive. Learning of his nephew's identity, Ben attempts to arrange a meeting to talk Phil down and convince him to accept a cure for the Goblin formula. But when Robbie Robertson is discovered in the area, Phil believes that Ben had been trying to set a trap and delivers a serious injury to Robbie. Urich is able to get away when Ben convinces Superior Spider-Man to take Robbie to hospital, but Ben makes it clear having no interest in protecting Urich, acknowledging that Phil liked what he is now and was uninterested in redemption or help.

Goblin King
Following the conclusion of The Superior Spider-Man storyline where the true Spider-Man returns, Urich now leads the Goblin Nation's remnants as the self-proclaimed Goblin King. He meets with Mister Negative where they wait for Eel to show up in order to divide the criminal underground following Osborn's defeat. The meeting is crashed by Black Cat and Electro. Black Cat mentions to Goblin King and Mister Negative that Spider-Man had outed them and wants a share in their plans.

During the "AXIS" storyline, Goblin King attempts to rescue Lily Hollister from a police transport; this mission goes awry and Lily is rendered amnesiac. When Goblin King confronts Kingsley in the latter's headquarters, Queen Cat comes to the defense. Goblin King recognizes Hollister as Queen Cat, but Lily does not recognize him. Following the attack, Missile Mate is convinced by Urich that the Hobgoblin would soon abandon the heroes that were trained. Missile Mate goes to the Goblin Nation's headquarters and asks Goblin King to join and be a supervillain. Goblin King is reluctant, but Missile Mate shows him that he has also gathered all the supervillains that the Hobgoblin had "abandoned" (consisting of 8-Ball III, Killer Shrike II, Melter III, Tiger Shark II, and Unicorn IV) after becoming a good guy. While the celebration of Hobgoblin Day is being held with a parade in Kingsley's honor, Missile Mate betrays the Hobgoblin and attempts to murder in the Goblin King's name. Kingsley, however, had already expected the betrayal and had been using a hologram decoy which took Missile Mate's blow. As soon as Kinglsey confronts Missile Mate, the Goblin King appears with his Goblin Nation and attacks the celebration. The Hobgoblin bests Goblin King in combat and delivers him and the Goblin Nation members with him to the authorities.

Having escaped prison under undisclosed circumstances during the "Go Down Swinging" storyline, Urich raids one of Osborn's old gentlemen's clubs to acquire the Goblin weaponry Osborn stored there, but Osborn- currently wielding the Carnage symbiote's power- apparently kills Urich by tearing his heart out.

Powers and abilities

As Green Goblin
Due to ingestion of a modified version of Norman Osborn's "Goblin Formula", Urich gains superhuman strength (able to lift upwards of 9 tons), stamina, durability, speed, and reflexes. However, he is unable to access these abilities without the unknown catalyst provided by the Goblin mask he wears. He also possesses a so-called "Lunatic Laugh" capable of creating sound waves disorienting to most people. It is possible that the formula also increased his intelligence since he has shown to have an unusual cleverness when it came to strategy and modifying his equipment, as the Goblin formula had done for other users. Whether or not he needed the mask for this was unknown. As the Goblin, Urich wears an alternate/spare Goblin costume composed of a chain-mail mesh capable of deflecting small arms fire. He travels on a bat-shaped, one-man, rocket-propelled "Goblin Glider". Like other Goblin gliders, it is armed with heat-seeking missiles, machine guns, and retractable blades. Other weapons Urich typically uses are incendiary Pumpkin Bombs capable of melting through  of steel, smoke and gas-emitting bombs with an appearance like a ghost, razor-edged bat-shaped boomerangs and gloves woven with micro-circuited filaments capable of discharging nearly 1,000 volts of electricity. Most of this equipment was completely destroyed or rendered inoperable during Urich's final battle with the Sentinel.

As Hobgoblin

As the Hobgoblin, Phil wears an orange Hobgoblin costume with wings on the back that allow him to fly without the use of a Goblin Glider and he took Roderick Kingsley's mask as his own. He uses the traditional Pumpkin Bombs all Green Goblins and Hobgoblins before him have used, but he also has a new flaming sword. He still retains his "Lunatic Laugh" from when he was the Goblin and he also has superhuman strength, speed, durability, stamina, reflexes and senses, and enhanced intellect. For unknown reasons, he no longer needs his mask to activate this power. With the help of Reverbium, his "Lunatic Laugh" was able to cause a building to collapse.

Reception
 In 2021, Screen Rant included Phil Urich in their "10 Best Marvel Legacy Villains Who Lived Up To Their Predecessor" list.

Other versions

MC2
In the MC2 timeline, Phil Urich marries his girlfriend Meredith Campbell and becomes a forensic scientist and friend of Peter Parker. He is aware of both Peter and Spider-Girl's identities. Phil resumes the Goblin identity, first under the Golden Goblin name, then as the Green Goblin with Normie Osborn's assistance. After Urich loses a long series of battles, Normie recreates Urich's original mask, which grants superhuman strength and other abilities, greatly enhancing effectiveness. He is also a founding member of the new New Warriors. While Urich originally required the technology in the Goblin mask to enhance his physical abilities, he retained one power that he is able to activate without the Goblin mask. Urich is capable of using his laughter as a sonic weapon of sorts. His "lunatic laugh" has been shown to disorient opponents and even shatter their eardrums. He once used the laugh while out of costume to defeat the Venom symbiote after taking possession of Peter.

In other media
 The Phil Urich incarnation of the Hobgoblin received a figure in the Heroclix line.
 The Phil Urich incarnation of the Hobgoblin is incorporated into Harry Osborn's character in Spider-Man, voiced by Max Mittelman.

Collected editions

Green Goblin

Hobgoblin

References

External links
 Phil Urich at Marvel.com
 Phil Urich at Marvel Wiki
 Phil Urich at Comic Vine

Characters created by Gerry Conway
Comics characters introduced in 1995
Fictional characters with superhuman durability or invulnerability
Fictional goblins
Marvel Comics characters who can move at superhuman speeds
Marvel Comics characters with superhuman strength
Marvel Comics mutates
Marvel Comics scientists
Marvel Comics superheroes
Marvel Comics supervillains
Spider-Man characters
Fictional characters from New York City
Fictional forensic scientists
Green Goblin
Hobgoblin (comics)